Jeanette Rose Grant-Woodham, OD (born 13 July 1938) is a Jamaican politician. She was President of the Senate of Jamaica from 21 August 1984 to 1989. She was born at Ocho Rios.

See also
List of presidents of the Senate of Jamaica

References

1938 births 
Living people
Members of the Senate of Jamaica
20th-century Jamaican women politicians
20th-century Jamaican politicians
Industry ministers of Jamaica
Trade ministers of Jamaica